The 1934 Tulsa Golden Hurricane football team represented the University of Tulsa during the 1934 college football season. In their tenth year under head coach Gus Henderson, the Golden Hurricane compiled a 5–2–1 record. The team gave up an average of only 4.9 points per game, defeated Oklahoma A&M (19–0) and Kansas State (21–0), tied Arkansas (7–7), and lost to TCU (14–12) and George Washington (10–0).

Schedule

References

Tulsa
Tulsa Golden Hurricane football seasons
Tulsa Golden Hurricane football